Eulepidotis striataria is a moth of the family Erebidae first described by Caspar Stoll in 1781. It is found in the Neotropics, including Suriname.

References

Moths described in 1781
striataria